Maharaja is a 1998 Indian Hindi superhero film directed by Anil Sharma. There is a guy who is always on horse and took maharaja's mother  It stars Govinda and Manisha Koirala in the title roles. It is about the struggle of a prince with supernatural powers to get his kingdom back.

Plot
Fearing his death, Ranbir Singh (Salim Ghouse) decides to kill Kohinoor when he is a child, though in vain. After 20 years, Kohinoor (Govinda) returns to claim his rightful place in the kingdom. He has developed advanced powers over matter and animals, which he uses to his advance to free his nanny, Ameenabi (Aruna Irani) who is being held by Ranbir and his associates. Kohinoor must pass numerous tests, including being exploited by a television reporter, Shaili Mathur (Manisha Koirala), who claims that she loves him; and fight hungry, blinded, man-eating lions.

Cast
 Govinda as Prince Kohinoor Karan
 Manisha Koirala as Shaili Mathur
 Raj Babbar as Ali
 Salim Ghouse as Ranbir Singh
 Shakti Kapoor as Bhalu Prasad Bihari Orey
 Kulbhushan Kharbanda as Hanuman Baba
 Prem Chopra as Suryamani
 Ishrat Ali as Devkaran
 Aparajita Bhushan as Kohinoor's mom
 Kunika as Mrs. Singh, Ranvir's wife
 Lambodar Nahak  as Bride Broker
 Shashikala as Ranvir's mother
 Shanoor Mirza as Tutu, Shaili's younger brother
 Aruna Irani as Amina Bi
 Syed Badr-ul Hasan Khan Bahadur
 Sudhir as Hunter

Soundtrack
The music of Maharaja has been composed by Nadeem-Shravan with lyrics by Sameer. Tracks like 'Jab Tum Aajate Ho Saamne' became famous during the release.

Reception
Although the film wasn't received positively by all the critics, the actors were praised for their performance.

References

External links 
 

1998 films
1990s Hindi-language films
Films scored by Nadeem–Shravan
Films directed by Anil Sharma
Indian supernatural films
Indian superhero films
Indian superheroes